The Council of Baptist Churches in Northern India is a Baptist Christian denomination in India. It belongs to the Baptist World Alliance. The Council of Baptist Churches in Northern India belongs to the National Council of Churches in India. Furthermore, it is a member of the Asia Pacific Baptist Federation. The Council of Baptist Churches in Northeast India is another denomination.

References 

Baptist denominations in India
Affiliated institutions of the National Council of Churches in India